The 2012–13 season was APOEL's 73rd season in the Cypriot First Division and 85th year in existence as a football club.

Season review

Pre-season and friendlies
The first training session for the season took place on 11 June 2012 at APOEL's training centre. On 23 June 2012, the team flew to Obertraun in Austria to perform the main stage of their pre-season training and returned to Cyprus on 7 July 2012. During the pre-season training stage in Austria, APOEL played four friendly matches against Blau-Weiss Linz, MFK Košice, SK Sturm Graz and SV Ried. APOEL lost 1–2 by Blau-Weiss Linz, drew 1–1 with SK Sturm Graz and won MFK Košice by 2–0 and SV Ried by 3–2.

Cypriot First Division

Regular season
On 3 September 2012, APOEL opened their competitive season with a 0–5 win at the Tasos Markou Stadium against Enosis Neon Paralimni. Aldo Adorno scored a hat-trick, while Gustavo Manduca and Constantinos Charalambides scored two more goals for APOEL. On 16 September 2012, APOEL hosted Doxa Katokopias at GSP Stadium, in a match which was played behind closed doors. APOEL won 3–1, with Aldo Adorno scoring twice and Efstathios Aloneftis adding another one to the scoreline. On 22 September 2012, APOEL won 1–3 Alki at Larnaca, with Mario Budimir, Gustavo Manduca and Aldo Adorno scoring one goal each. On 30 September 2012, APOEL beat Apollon Limassol 1–0 at home, with Aldo Adorno scoring the winning goal in the 79th minute. On 7 October 2012, Omonia hosted APOEL at GSP Stadium in a match which ended in a goalless draw. On 22 October 2012, APOEL won Olympiakos Nicosia at home by 4–0, with two goals from Nuno Morais and one goal from Aldo Adorno and Gustavo Manduca. On 27 October 2012, APOEL beat Nea Salamina at Ammochostos Stadium by 0–3. Hélio Pinto opened the score in the first half and Efstathios Aloneftis who came on as a substitute scored twice in the second half. On 5 November 2012, APOEL's impressive run continued by winning Ayia Napa 4–1 at home, with a hat-trick from Aldo Adorno and a goal from Gustavo Manduca. On 11 November 2012, Aritz Borda's goal gave APOEL a narrow 0–1 win over Ethnikos Achna at Dasaki Stadium. On 18 November 2012, APOEL suffered its first league defeat after losing 1–2 at home to AEK Larnaca and fell out of first place for the first time during the season. Albert Serrán opened the score in the first half and Hélio Pinto equalised early in the second half before Jason Demetriou score the winner for AEK. On 26 November 2012, APOEL beat reigning champions AEL Limassol by 1–3 at Tsirion Stadium and became the first team which won AEL this season. Hélio Pinto opened the scoring in the 4th minute and AEL equalised ten minutes later but Gustavo Manduca in the 23rd minute gave APOEL the lead again. Despite APOEL was playing with ten players for almost 30 minutes after Aritz Borda was shown the red card in the 64th minute, Constantinos Charalambides scored a third goal ten minutes before the end to give APOEL a very important victory. On 2 December 2012, APOEL beat AEP Paphos by 0–2 at Pafiako Stadium, with two goals scored from Gustavo Manduca and Selim Benachour. On 8 December 2012, APOEL suffered its second league defeat, losing 0-1 at home to Anorthosis and remained in second place, four points behind leaders Anorthosis. On 15 December 2012, Aldo Adorno's goal in the 76th minute gave APOEL a narrow 1–0 home win over Enosis Neon Paralimni. On 22 December 2012, APOEL won 0–3 at Doxa Katokopias, with Gustavo Manduca scoring twice in the first half and Aldo Adorno scoring another one in the second half. On 6 January 2013, APOEL drew 1–1 with Alki Larnaca at home, with a last-minute equalising goal from Mário Sérgio. On 14 January 2013, APOEL faced Apollon Limassol at Tsirion Stadium and won by 1–2 with a last-minute winner. Apollon took the lead in the first half, but Selim Benachour's early equaliser in the second half and Hélio Pinto's free-kick winner in the 12th minute of added time secured an important victory for APOEL. On 19 January 2013, APOEL drew 1–1 against eternal rivals Omonia, with Hélio Pinto opening the score early in the first half and Omonia equalising after one hour of play. On 27 January 2013, Gustavo Manduca scored twice in the second half and helped APOEL to beat Olympiakos Nicosia by 0–2 at GSP Stadium. On 2 February 2013, APOEL got a 2–0 home victory against Nea Salamina, in a behind closed doors match. Nektarios Alexandrou opened the scoreline in the first half and Dudu Biton scored on his debut just five minutes after being subbed in the 85th minute. On 11 February 2013, APOEL record its third consecutive 2–0 league win – this time over Ayia Napa at Tasos Markou Stadium – by two goals of Aritz Borda and Dudu Biton. On 27 February 2013, APOEL faced Ethnikos Achna at home in a behind closed doors match and won by 1–0 with an early second half goal from Dudu Biton. On 3 March 2013, APOEL beat AEK Larnaca by 0–1 at GSZ Stadium, with Mikkel Beckmann netting the game's only goal with long-range effort in the 75th minute. So, after 23rd matchweek results, APOEL was only one point behind leaders Anorthosis. On 9 March 2013, Nektarios Alexandrou scored twice to lead APOEL to 2–0 home victory over AEL Limassol and APOEL moved up to first place after four months. On 17 March 2013, APOEL demolished AEP Paphos 6–0 at home, recording seven consecutive wins without conceding a goal and opened up a three-point gap over the second placed team Anorthosis. Mário Sérgio and Mikkel Beckmann scored APOEL's first two goals, while Dudu Biton and Constantinos Charalambides each scored twice for the final 6–0 victory for APOEL. On 31 March 2013, APOEL achieved the most important victory (so far) in the season by beating the second placed team Anorthosis 0–2 at Antonis Papadopoulos Stadium and opened up a six-point gap from its rivals. Dudu Biton gave his team the lead after 68 minutes of play and Nuno Morais secured APOEL's victory 12 minutes later with a long range effort.

Play–offs
On 6 April 2013, APOEL suffered its first defeat after an eight straight wins run, losing 3–0 at Omonia in the first Championship play-off match. The same time Anorthosis also lost 0–3 at home by AEK Larnaca and so APOEL remained at top with a six-point gap from the second place. On 13 April 2013, APOEL hosted Anorthosis and maintained their six-point advantage thanks to a 0–0 draw at GSP Stadium. On 21 April 2013, APOEL beat AEK Larnaca 0–1 at GSZ Stadium, thanks to Mário Sérgio's direct free-kick in the 63rd minute and opened up an eight-point gap over the second placed team Anorthosis who drew 0–0 against Omonia. On 27 April 2013, APOEL lost 0–1 at home to AEK Larnaca, but one day later Anorthosis also lost 4–0 at Omonia and APOEL were eventually crowned champions for the 22nd time in their history after a very difficult and harsh season. On 12 May 2013, APOEL celebrated their 22nd Championship title in style with an impressive 4–3 win over their arch rivals Omonia and ensured coach Ivan Jovanović’s last home game was a memorable one. Efstathios Aloneftis scored his first goal against his former club, Mario Budimir and Nuno Morais also got on the score sheet, before Gustavo Manduca scoring the winner in the 83rd minute after converting a penalty. At the end of the match, Marinos Satsias, Constantinos Charalambidis and Ivan Jovanović lifted all together the Championship trophy in front of 16,000 fans to officially crown APOEL as the Cypriot First Division champions for the season. On 18 May 2013, APOEL lost at Anorthosis by 2–1, while Gustavo Manduca scored his 12th league goal, in APOEL's last match of the season.

Cypriot Cup
On 31 October 2012, APOEL beat Chalkanoras by 8–1 at GSP Stadium and qualified for the second round of the 2012–13 Cypriot Cup. Both Constantinos Charalambides and Esteban Solari scored a hat-trick, while Selim Benachour and Mário Sérgio scored two more goals for APOEL. In the second round, APOEL drawn against AEL Limassol. In the first leg match which was held on 9 January 2013, APOEL won 0–2 at Tsirion Stadium with a goal from Michael Klukowski and an own goal from Edmar. In the second leg which was held at GSP Stadium on 23 January 2013, APOEL took the lead in the 2nd minute of the match but AEL surprisingly managed to score three goals to make it 1–3 and qualified for the quarter-finals on away goals rule after a 3–3 aggregate.

UEFA Europa League
The team finished 2nd in the Cypriot First Division last season and as such entered the second qualifying round of the 2012–13 UEFA Europa League, drawing with Slovak club FK Senica. APOEL qualified for the next round by winning 2–0 (Aílton, Nektarios Alexandrou) at home and 1–0 (Hélio Pinto) at Senica. In the third qualifying round APOEL faced Aalesunds FK from Norway and qualified for the play-offs by winning 2–1 (Mário Sérgio, Efstathios Aloneftis) at home and 1–0 (Aldo Adorno) at Ålesund. In the play-offs APOEL eliminated from Neftchi Baku by drawing 1–1 (Selim Benachour) at Baku and losing 1–3 (Selim Benachour) unexpectedly at home.

Current squad
Last Update: January 29, 2013

For recent transfers, see List of Cypriot football transfers summer 2012.
 Also, see List of Cypriot football transfers winter 2012–13.

Out on loan

International players

Foreign players

Squad changes

In:

Total expenditure:  €270K

Out:

Total income:  €3.4M
{|

Club

Management

Kit

|
|
|

Other information

Squad stats

Top scorers

Last updated: May 18, 2013
Source: Match reports in Competitive matches, apoelfc.com.cy

Captains
  Marinos Satsias
  Constantinos Charalambides
  Marios Elia
  Hélio Pinto

Pre-season friendlies

Mid-season friendlies

Competitions

Overall

Cypriot First Division

Classification

Results summary

Results by round

Play-offs table
The first 12 teams are divided into 3 groups. Points are carried over from the regular season.

Group A

Matches
Kick-off times are in EET.

Regular season

Play-offs

UEFA Europa League

Qualifying phase

Second qualifying round

Third qualifying round

Play-off round

Cypriot Cup

First round

Second round

References

2012-13
APOEL F.C. season